In the subject of manifold theory in mathematics, if  is a manifold with boundary, its double is obtained by gluing two copies of  together along their common boundary. Precisely, the double is  where  for all . 

Doubles bound 

This gives doubles a special role in cobordism.

Examples 

The n-sphere is the double of the n-ball. In this context, the two balls would be the upper and lower hemi-sphere respectively. Even more generally, the double of a disc bundle over a manifold is a sphere bundle over the same manifold. More concretely, the double of the Möbius strip is the Klein bottle.

The double of a Mazur manifold is a homotopy 4-sphere.

References

Differential topology
Manifolds